Ammi-Ditana was a king of Babylon who reigned from 1683–1640s BC. He was preceded by Abi-Eshuh. Year-names survive for the first 37 years of his reign, plus fragments for a few possible additional years. His reign was a largely peaceful one; he was primarily engaged in enriching and enlarging the temples, and a few other building projects, although in his 37th regnal year he recorded having destroyed the city wall of Der, built earlier by Damiq-ilishu of Isin.

References

17th-century BC Babylonian kings
First dynasty of Babylon